James Crowley (born 1930) is an Irish retired Gaelic footballer who played for club side St. Vincent's and at inter-county level with the Dublin senior football team.

Career

A member of the St. Vincent's club, Crowley first came to prominence in 1947 when he was selected for the Leinster Colleges and Dublin minor teams. He subsequently broke onto the senior side and enjoyed his first success in 1953 when he won the first of three National League medals. Two years later Crowley had secured his first Leinster Championship medal, while he also lined out in the 1955 All-Ireland final defeat by Kerry. He won three provincial titles in total and lined out at centre-back in Dublin's 1958 All-Ireland final defeat of Derry.

Honours

Dublin
All-Ireland Senior Football Championship: 1958
Leinster Senior Football Championship: 1955, 1958, 1959
National Football League: 1952-53, 1954-55, 1957-58

References

1930 births
Living people
St Vincents (Dublin) Gaelic footballers
Dublin inter-county Gaelic footballers